"She's Mine" is a song recorded by American country music singer Kip Moore. It is the first single to his fourth studio album Wild World. The song was written by Moore, along with Dan Couch and Scott Stepakoff.

Background
Moore said: “I wrote this song at a time in my life when I realized that my life was flipped upside down and I didn’t know which way was up.” “Every experience from there forward, I felt like everything was going to be a surprise. I didn't know where I was going to end up, who I was going to meet or who I was going to be with. I’m fired up to be getting new music out there, and this song is just the beginning. I know the fans are ready and so am I.”

Music video
The Music video was uploaded on September 12, 2019, directed by PJ Brown. Moore looking for love in all the fun places, and finds himself interacting with a wide range of women including a cheerleader, hippie, rockstar.

Charts

Weekly charts

Year-end charts

Certifications

References

External links
 

2020 singles
2020 songs
Kip Moore songs
Songs written by Kip Moore
MCA Nashville Records singles
Songs written by Dan Couch